Mezran (also Romanized as Merzān and Mazrān; also known as Merzarān) is a village in Kalashi Rural District, Kalashi District, Javanrud County, Kermanshah Province, Iran. At the 2006 census, its population was 307, in 67 families.

References 

Populated places in Javanrud County